The following is an overview of 2013 in Chinese music.

TV shows
I Am a Singer (seaon 1) (January 18 – April 12)
The Voice of China (season 2) (July 12 – October 7)

Awards

2013 Chinese Music Awards
2013 Global Chinese Music Awards
2013 Migu Music Awards 
2013 MTV Europe Music Awards Best Chinese & Hong Kong Act: Li Yuchun
2013 MTV Europe Music Awards Best Asian Act: Li Yuchun
2013 Music Pioneer Awards
2013 Music Radio China Top Chart Awards
2013 Top Chinese Music Awards
The 1st V Chart Awards

Debuting

Solos
Li Ronghao

Releases

June

August

September

December

References 

2013 in Chinese music
2013 in music